The 2002 Players Championship was a golf tournament in Florida on the PGA Tour, held  at TPC Sawgrass in Ponte Vedra Beach, southeast of Jacksonville. It was the 29th Players Championship. 

Unheralded Craig Perks gained his only career win on the PGA Tour, two strokes ahead of runner-up Stephen Ames. In the last three holes, Perks chipped in twice; for eagle at 16 and for par at 18. In between, he made a  birdie putt on the Island Green; he had only two pars in the last fourteen holes. 

Starting the year at 256 in the world rankings, Perks moved from 203 to 64 with the win.

Defending champion Tiger Woods finished seven strokes back, in a tie for fourteenth place.

Venue

Field
Fulton Allem, Robert Allenby, Stephen Ames, Billy Andrade, Stuart Appleby, Woody Austin, Paul Azinger, Briny Baird, Craig Barlow, Cameron Beckman, Rich Beem, Notah Begay III, David Berganio Jr., Thomas Bjørn, Jay Don Blake, Mark Brooks, Olin Browne, Ángel Cabrera, Mark Calcavecchia, Michael Campbell, Jim Carter, Greg Chalmers, Brandel Chamblee, K. J. Choi, Stewart Cink, Michael Clark II, Darren Clarke, John Cook, Fred Couples, John Daly, Robert Damron, Glen Day, Chris DiMarco, Scott Dunlap, Joe Durant, David Duval, Joel Edwards, Steve Elkington, Ernie Els, Bob Estes, Nick Faldo, Niclas Fasth, Brad Faxon, Steve Flesch, Dan Forsman, Carlos Franco, Harrison Frazar, David Frost, Ed Fryatt, Fred Funk, Jim Furyk, Sergio García, Brian Gay, Brent Geiberger, Matt Gogel, Retief Goosen, David Gossett, Paul Gow, Jay Haas, Pádraig Harrington, Dudley Hart, J. P. Hayes, J. J. Henry, Tim Herron, Glen Hnatiuk, Scott Hoch, Charles Howell III, John Huston, Lee Janzen, Miguel Ángel Jiménez, Brandt Jobe, Per-Ulrik Johansson, Steve Jones, Shingo Katayama, Jonathan Kaye, Jerry Kelly, Skip Kendall, Tom Kite, Greg Kraft, Matt Kuchar, Neal Lancaster, Bernhard Langer, Paul Lawrie, Ian Leggatt, Tom Lehman, Justin Leonard, J. L. Lewis, Frank Lickliter, Davis Love III, Steve Lowery, Jeff Maggert, Shigeki Maruyama, Len Mattiace, Bob May, Billy Mayfair, Scott McCarron, Paul McGinley, Rocco Mediate, Phil Mickelson, Larry Mize, Colin Montgomerie, Michael Muehr, Frank Nobilo, Greg Norman, Mark O'Meara, Geoff Ogilvy, José María Olazábal, Jesper Parnevik, Craig Parry, Carl Paulson, Dennis Paulson, Corey Pavin, David Peoples, Craig Perks, Tom Pernice Jr., Kenny Perry, Nick Price, Brett Quigley, Chris Riley, Loren Roberts, Rory Sabbatini, Tom Scherrer, Adam Scott, Scott Simpson, Joey Sindelar, Vijay Singh, Jeff Sluman, Chris Smith, Jerry Smith, Mike Sposa, Craig Stadler, Paul Stankowski, Steve Stricker, Kevin Sutherland, Hal Sutton, Esteban Toledo, David Toms, Kirk Triplett, Bob Tway, Scott Verplank, Grant Waite, Duffy Waldorf, Brian Watts, Mike Weir, Lee Westwood, Jay Williamson, Garrett Willis, Tiger Woods, Kaname Yokoo

Round summaries

First round
Thursday, March 21, 2002

Second round
Friday, March 22, 2002
Saturday, March 23, 2002

Third round
Saturday, March 23, 2002

Source:

Final round
Sunday, March 24, 2002

Craig Perks chipped in on the 16th and 18th holes to win the championship, his only PGA Tour victory. His lone putt in the last three holes was a 28-foot birdie putt on the 17th.

Scorecard
Final round

Cumulative tournament scores, relative to par

Source:

References

External links
The Players Championship website
Full Leaderboard

2002
2002 in golf
2002 in American sports
2002 in sports in Florida
March 2002 sports events in the United States